Comgás is a Brazilian gas distributor focused on São Paulo state. Comgás was founded in 1872. The company had been wholly owned by the São Paulo state-owned power generation utility, Companhia Energética de São Paulo until April 1999, when CESP's stake was sold to the British BG Group and to Royal Dutch Shell. Comgas sells gas under a 30-year franchise, with a potential for a further 20 years.

Comgás distributes piped gas to more than 1.7 million consumers in the residential, commercial, industrial, automotive, cogeneration and thermogeneration segments in 88 cities in its concession area - São Paulo Metropolitan Region, Vale do Paraíba, Baixada Santista and Campinas Administrative Region. 

Brazilian conglomerate Cosan owns 61.73% of Comgas's stock, and Shell 17.12%. The remainder is publicly traded on B3. Cosan acquired its stake from BG Group in November 2012 for $1.7 billion.

Locations 
In September 2021, Comgas has opened a new compressed natural gas (CNG) filling station in Taboao, on the border between So Paulo and Curitiba, to increase the supply for trucks and buses in Brazil.

References

External links

 The company's home page in Portuguese

Companies based in São Paulo
Oil and gas companies of Brazil
Companies listed on B3 (stock exchange)
Brazilian brands